The Sphere-class cruise ship is a class of cruise ships under construction that will enter service with Princess Cruises in 2024. They will be the largest ships built for Princess Cruises and the company's first ships powered by liquefied natural gas (LNG). The first name was revealed to be Sun Princess.

Design and construction 
Steel was cut for the first ship at Fincantieri in September 2021. The second ship is planned to be completed in 2025. It will be the largest ship ever built in Italy, eclipsing MSC Cruises' recently launched flagship MSC Seashore which currently holds the record at 170,412 gross tons.

Ships in class

References 

Princess Cruises
Cruise ships